A falchion (Old French: fauchon; Latin: falx, "sickle") is a one-handed, single-edged sword of European origin. Falchions are found in different forms from around the 13th century up to and including the 16th century. In some versions, the falchion looks rather like the seax and later the sabre, and in other versions more like a machete with a crossguard.

Types

The blade designs of falchions varied widely across the continent and over time. They almost always included a single edge with a slight curve on the blade towards the point on the end and most were also affixed with a quilloned crossguard for the hilt in the manner of the contemporary arming swords. Unlike the double-edged swords of Europe, few actual swords of this type have survived to the present day; fewer than a dozen specimens are currently known.  A number of weapons similar to the falchion existed in Western Europe, including the Messer, hanger and the backsword. Two basic types of falchion can be identified:

Cleaver falchions
One of the few surviving falchions (the Conyers falchion) is shaped very much like a large meat cleaver, or large bladed machete. This type is also illustrated in art.  The type seems to be confined to the 13th and 14th centuries. However apart from the profile they present a very thin blade, often only 1.2 mm thick spines, 7 cm from the point with a slight taper leading near to the edge before dropping into a secondary bevel which brings the blade to a very acute edge while maintaining some durability. Current theories are that they were the anti-cloth armour weapon of the day.

Cusped falchions
The majority of the depictions in art reflect a design similar to that of the großes Messer. The Thorpe Falchion, a surviving example from England's 13th century, was just under  in weight. Of its  length,  are the straight blade which bears a cusped or flare-clipped tip similar to the much later kilij of Turkey. This type of sword continued in use into the 16th century.

Other falchions

In addition, there are a group of 13th- and early 14th-century weapons sometimes identified with the falchion. These are seen in numerous illustrations in the mid-13th-century Maciejowski Bible.

Status
A falchion had a lower quality and status than the longer, more expensive swords, as almost none of them survive today. Falchions are sometimes misunderstood and thought of as being similar to machetes; however, the ancient falchions that have been discovered are very thin and on average, lighter than a double-edged blade. These weapons were therefore not cleaving or chopping weapons similar to the machete, but quick slashing weapons more similar to shamshir or sabres despite their wide blade. While falchions are commonly thought to be peasants' weapons this is not always the case; the Conyers falchion belonged to a landed family, and the falchion is shown in illustrations of combat between mounted knights. Some later falchions were ornate and used by the nobility; there is an elaborately engraved and gold plated falchion from the 1560s in the Wallace Collection, engraved with the personal coat of arms of Cosimo I de' Medici, Grand Duke of Tuscany.

Popular culture
 A falchion was used by the Minotaur General Otmin, leader for the White Witch's army in The Chronicles of Narnia: The Lion, the Witch and the Wardrobe.
 In Sailor Moon, Sailor Uranus' Space Sword is themed after a falchion.
 In Brisingr, Eragon uses a falchion after he loses his first sword, Zar'roc, in the climactic battle of Eldest. The weapon is suggested to him on the basis that he has learned to fight with a weapon impervious to damage, and thus requires a weapon more durable against edge damage. Nonetheless, the falchion is later shattered in a fight, and is replaced by Eragon's third and final sword, Brisingr.
 In the Fire Emblem series, several games feature a magical sword named Falchion. However, the swords themselves feature the more common medieval straight double-edged blade.
 In the video game Dungeons and Dragons Online, the falchion is a curved blade wielded with two hands rather than one.

References

External links
The Falchion sword – a wonderful curved sword

Single-edged swords
Medieval blade weapons